XVIII Brigade, Royal Horse Artillery (Territorial Force) was a Royal Horse Artillery brigade of the Territorial Force that was formed by the Egyptian Expeditionary Force in Palestine in July 1917 for the ANZAC Mounted Division.  It served with the division thereafter in the Sinai and Palestine Campaign and was broken up after the end of World War I.

History

Background
The ANZAC Mounted Division was formed in Egypt in March 1916 with four cavalry brigades.  Four British Territorial Force horse artillery batteries were assigned to the division to provide artillery support (one per brigade).  These were controlled by two Royal Horse Artillery brigade headquarters: III Brigade, RHA (T.F.) and IV Brigade, RHA (T.F.).  The ANZAC Mounted Division served with the Desert Column in the Sinai and Palestine Campaign from the Battle of Magdhaba (23 December 1916) through to the Second Battle of Gaza (1719 April 1917).

In June 1917, the Desert Column was reorganised from two mounted divisions of four brigades each (ANZAC and Imperial Mounted Divisions) to three mounted divisions of three brigades each (ANZAC, AustralianImperial Mounted Division renamedand the new Yeomanry Mounted Division).  Consequently, the British 22nd Mounted Brigade was transferred from the ANZAC to the Yeomanry Mounted Division on 6 July 1917.  With a reduction to three brigades, there was a corresponding reduction in the artillery to three batteries.  The Leicestershire Battery, RHA (T.F.) departed on 20 June to join XX Brigade, RHA (T.F.) in the Yeomanry Mounted Division.

Formation
In July 1917, the artillery of the ANZAC Mounted Division was reorganized.  The existing III and IV Brigade HQs were dissolved and XVIII Brigade, Royal Horse Artillery (Territorial Force) was formed for the division with
Ayrshire Battery, RHA (T.F.) from IV Brigade
Inverness-shire Battery, RHA (T.F.) also from IV Brigade
Somerset Battery, RHA (T.F.) from III Brigade
In practice, the batteries were permanently attached to the mounted brigades: Somerset RHA to the 1st Light Horse Brigade, Inverness-shire RHA to the 2nd Light Horse Brigade and Ayrshire RHA to the New Zealand Mounted Rifles Brigade.

The batteries had each been re-equipped with four 18 pounders before the First Battle of Gaza in March 1917.  They were still equipped with 18 pounders when the brigade was organised but were re-equipped with 13 pounders (four per battery) in time for the Third Battle of Gaza at the end of October 1917.

Service
The brigade, and its batteries, served with the ANZAC Mounted Division throughout the rest of the Sinai and Palestine Campaign.  As part of the Desert Mounted Corps, the division took part in the Third Battle of Gaza, in particular the Capture of Beersheba (31 October) and the Battle of Mughar Ridge (13 and 14 November), and the defence of Jerusalem against the Turkish counter-attacks (27 November3 December).

At the beginning of 1918, the division was attached to XX Corps and helped to capture Jericho (1921 February) and then formed part of Shea's Force for the First Trans-Jordan Raid (21 March2 April).  It returned to the Desert Mounted Corps for the Second Trans-Jordan Raid  (30 April4 May), the Battle of Abu Tellul (14 July) and the capture of Amman (25 September).

Dissolved
After the Armistice of Mudros, the division was withdrawn to Egypt.  The Australian brigades departed for home in March and April 1919 and the New Zealanders by the end of July.  The brigade was broken up some time after April 1919.

See also

Notes

References

Bibliography

External links
The Royal Horse Artillery on The Long, Long Trail
The Great War Royal Horse Artillery

Royal Horse Artillery brigades
Artillery units and formations of World War I
Military units and formations established in 1917
Military units and formations disestablished in 1919